The 1932–33 NCAA men's basketball season began in December 1932, progressed through the regular season and conference tournaments, and concluded in March 1933.

Rule changes
 To reduce stalling, a mid-court line is introduced: After crossing it, a team on offense was not permitted to move the ball back across the line. Previously, teams on offense could use the entire court to spread the defense thin, and often played keep-away without trying to score, leading to dull, low-scoring games.
 A player with the ball was prohibited from standing in the free-throw lane (also known as the "key") for more than three seconds.
 The number of referees increased from one to two.

Season headlines 

 The Eastern Intercollegiate Conference began play, with five original members.
 The Southeastern Conference began play, with 13 original members.
 In February 1943, the Helms Athletic Foundation retroactively selected Kentucky as its national champion for the 1932–33 season.
 In 1995, the Premo-Porretta Power Poll retroactively selected Texas as its national champion for the 1932–33 season.

Conference membership changes

Regular season

Conference winners and tournaments

Statistical leaders

Awards

Consensus All-American team

Major player of the year awards 

 Helms Player of the Year: Forest Sale, Kentucky (retroactive selection in 1944)

Coaching changes

References